Jefferson Township is one of thirteen townships in Noble County, Indiana, United States. As of the 2010 census, its population was 1,604 and it contained 668 housing units.

Geography

Cities, towns, villages
 Albion (east edge)

Unincorporated towns
 Bakertown at 
(This list is based on USGS data and may include former settlements.)

Lakes
 Bushong Lake
 Indian Lake
 Schauweker Lake
 Skinner Lake
 Sweet Lake

School districts
 Central Noble Community School Corporation

Political districts
 Indiana's 3rd congressional district
 State House District 52
 State Senate District 13

References
 
 United States Census Bureau 2008 TIGER/Line Shapefiles
 IndianaMap

External links
 Indiana Township Association
 United Township Association of Indiana
 City-Data.com page for Jefferson Township

Townships in Noble County, Indiana
Townships in Indiana